The Ascendant is a golf tournament on the Korn Ferry Tour. Formerly known as the TPC Colorado Championship at Heron Lakes, it was first played in July 2019 in Berthoud, Colorado.  This was the first professional golf tournament played in Colorado since 2014. In 2021, this tournament was the first ever recipient of two Korn Ferry Tour awards in a singular year; Tournament of the Year and Volunteer of the Year.

The proceeds from the Ascendant at TPC Colorado benefit local Colorado charities.

Winners

Bolded golfers graduated to the PGA Tour via the Korn Ferry Tour regular-season money list.

References

External links

Coverage on the Korn Ferry Tour's official site

Korn Ferry Tour events
Golf in Colorado
Recurring sporting events established in 2019
2019 establishments in Colorado